The Southeast Asia Basketball Association (SEABA) is a subzone of FIBA Asia consisting of countries from Southeast Asia. The ASEAN Basketball League (ABL), a professional league, is the top level of club competition run by the SEABA.

Member nations 
 
 
 
 
 
 
 
 
 
  - moved to FIBA Oceania since August 2015

National team tournaments

SEABA Championship

The SEABA Championship is a tournament between national teams. It was first held in Segamat in 1994, and every two years thereafter. The fourth edition, which was held in Manila in 2001, changed the year of the subzone qualifiers in odd-numbered years, beginning that same year; and directly it became the main qualifying tournament for the FIBA Asia Championship.

  A 3rd Place Match took place between Malaysia and Thailand but the result is unknown.

SEABA Cup

The SEABA Cup is the qualifying tournament for the FIBA Asia Challenge, and is held in even-numbered years.

SEABA Championship for Women

The SEABA Championship for Women is a tournament between national teams.

SEABA Under-18 Championship

The SEABA Under-18 Championship is a tournament between national teams. The highest placers go to the FIBA Asia Under-18 Championship.

SEABA Under-16 Championship

The SEABA Under-16 Championship is a tournament between national teams. The highest placers go to the FIBA Asia Under-16 Championship.

Professional club tournaments
The ASEAN Basketball League is a tournament among professional club teams. The winner goes to the FIBA Asia Champions Cup. Formerly, from 2000 until 2008, SEABA held a club tournament known as SEABA Champions Cup.

SEABA Champions Cup

ASEAN Basketball League

  Finished regular season with the best win–loss record.

Overall medal table

See also
ABL 3x3 International Champions Cup

References

External links 
 2007 SEABA Champions Cup Qualifying Tournament at FIBAAsia.net
 SEABA Basketball Forum (Interbasket)
 SEABA Championships (Interbasket)
 SEABA History

Basketball governing bodies in Asia
SEABA Championship